Khadrala is located in tehsil Rohru of Himachal Pradesh. It is one of the oldest trading centers of upper Shimla lying adjacent to old Hindustan-Tibet Road. It is an historic place which has been visited by the former prime minister Pt. Jawaharlal Nehru along with his daughter Mrs. Indira Gandhi. It has a post office and a bank, one of the oldest in upper Shimla. It also provides a beautiful view of the green Mandalgarh Valley containing various fauna and flora. Chanshal and Mural Danda peaks are visible from here. This place has cold weather at all times of  year.known for its good quality of Himalayan Apple and potato.majestic mountain ranges of Kinnaur and upper Himalayas can be seen from here.beautiful view of mountain ranges is seen from khadrala 

Villages in Shimla district